= Mount Clitheroe =

Mountain in Alberta, Canada

Coordinates: 52.710°N 118.232°W

Mount Clitheroe is a summit in Alberta, Canada. It takes its name from Clitheroe, in England.
